Kudamattam is a 1997 Indian Malayalam comedy-drama film, written by Navaz Babu, and directed by Sundar Das who also produced the film under the banner of Aaradhana Arts. The film stars Vijayaraghavan, Biju Menon, Dileep, Manju Warrier, Mohini and Kalabhavan Mani in the lead roles. The film has musical score by Johnson.

Cast

Vijayaraghavan as Sivan Kutti
Biju Menon as Pankajakshan
Dileep as Appukuttan
Manju Warrier as Gauri
Mohini as Yashodha
Kalabhavan Mani
 Meghanathan as Muthu
Nadirsha
Baburaj
Aboobacker
Abu Salim
Jose Pellissery
Kalabhavan Narayanankutty
Kozhikode Sharada
Kuthiravattam Pappu as Nanu
Mala Aravindan
N. F. Varghese
Oduvil Unnikrishnan
Biyon
Niyas Backer

Soundtrack
The music was composed by Johnson and the lyrics were written by Kaithapram.

Box office
The film was a commercial success.

References

External links
 

1997 films
1990s Malayalam-language films
Films shot in Thrissur
Films directed by Sundar Das
Films scored by Johnson